Aleksei Aleksandrovich Puchkov (born 10 November 1982) is a former Russian professional football player.

Club career
He played 4 seasons in the Russian Football National League for 4 different clubs.

References

External links
 

1982 births
Footballers from Saint Petersburg
Living people
Russian footballers
Association football defenders
FC Petrotrest players
FC Novokuznetsk players
FC Chernomorets Novorossiysk players
FC Tyumen players
FC Nosta Novotroitsk players